Arouca 516 is a suspension bridge located in the municipality of Arouca, in the North Region and the Aveiro District of Portugal. It is suspended 175 m (574 ft) above the Paiva River, which it spans. Its name is a reference to its extension in meters and the municipality where it is located.

Construction of the bridge started in May 2018. It opened on 29 April 2021 to residents of the municipality and on 2 May to the general public, with prior purchase of tickets online. Access to the bridge is possible either from Canelas or Alvarenga and a guide always accompanies visitor groups. The first person to cross the bridge was Hugo Xavier.

The bridge was designed by the Portuguese research institution Itecons and constructed by Conduril Engenharia, S.A., at a cost of approximately €2.3 million.

See also
 List of notable pedestrian bridges

References

External links
 
 Alternate website

Pedestrian bridges in Portugal
Suspension bridges in Portugal
Bridges completed in 2021
2021 establishments in Portugal
Bridges in Aveiro District
Buildings and structures in Arouca, Portugal